"The Winds of Green Monday" was a 1965 Australian television play by Michael Noonan. It aired as part of Wednesday Theatre. It starred Terry Norris and was directed by Oscar Whitbread.

Plot
A crew deserts a ship to find their fortune in the 1850s goldfields. After three weeks of digging and nothing to show for it, the crew get restless despite the efforts of Welshman Jones. The ship's captain turns up at their shanty and tries to exercise his authority. Only the tragic accident which causes a young apprentice to lose his mind prevents the crew from returning to the ship. The captain forms a relationship with a singer.

Cast
Keith Lee as Scottish captain McKendrick
Terry Norris as Mate Roberts
Jennifer Wright as music hall singer Martha
Martin Magee as the young apprentice
George Whaley as Welshman Jones
Stanley Walsk as a Cockney seaman
Roly Barie
Nevil Thurgood
Tony McGrath

Production
It was one of 20 TV plays produced by the ABC in 1964 (and one of only three Australian scripts). It was filmed in Melbourne. Jennifer Wright and Stanley Walsh had just arrived in Australia from England and made their Australian TV debuts.

Reception
The Sydney Morning Herald praised the performances of Lee and Wright as "professional" but complained about the "stiffness of the dialogue" and said "the direction of the crowds with their rhubarb-rhubarb voices and their tinned and infuriatingly phony laughter drove us for solace across the dial."

British version
The play was adapted for British TV in 1965 starring Chips Rafferty.

References

External links
  (Australian Version)
  (British Version)
 The Winds of Green Monday at Austlit

1965 television plays
1965 Australian television episodes
1960s Australian television plays
Fiction set in the 1850s
Wednesday Theatre (season 1) episodes